The Private Secretary is a 1935 British comedy film directed by Henry Edwards and starring Edward Everett Horton, Barry MacKay, Judy Gunn and Oscar Asche. It is an adaptation of the play The Private Secretary by Charles Henry Hawtrey. It was made at Twickenham Studios.

Premise
A timid and dim-witted clergyman is duped into helping a playboy avoid his creditors, inherit his uncle's fortune and get the girl.

Cast
 Edward Everett Horton as Reverend Robert Spalding
 Barry MacKay as Douglas Cattermole
 Judy Gunn as Edith Marsland
 Oscar Asche as Robert Cattermole
 Sydney Fairbrother as Miss Ashford
 Michael Shepley as Henry Marsland
 Alastair Sim as Nebulae
 Aubrey Dexter as Gibson
 O. B. Clarence as Thomas Marsland
 Davina Craig as Annie

Critical reception
TV Guide felt the comedy of the Victorian farce "didn't translate well into later times. Horton and Sim (in a secondary role) serve as the film's saving graces with some nice comic moments", and Sky Movies agreed, calling the film "a mostly dismal British farce stickily directed by former acting superstar Henry Edwards, but held back from disaster by the pawkily amusing performances of Edward Everett Horton, dithering delightfully in the leading role, and Alastair Sim, offering a lugubrious contribution as Mr Nebulae."

References

External links

1935 films
1935 comedy films
British comedy films
Films directed by Henry Edwards
Films shot at Twickenham Film Studios
Films set in England
Films set in London
British films based on plays
British black-and-white films
1930s English-language films
1930s British films